Heart of the Woods is a 2019 romance visual novel developed and published by Studio Élan. The game follows a pair of influencers as they travel to a remote village where ghosts are rumored to reside. The game launched on February 15, 2019 for Linux, macOS, and Microsoft Windows. A port for the Nintendo Switch released on July 8, 2021, and for PlayStation 4 and PlayStation 5 on July 8, 2021, with Xbox One and Xbox Series X/S versions being planned for release.

Gameplay 
The game is a typical visual novel, with the player's main form of interaction being clicking forward through text to progress between scenes. At certain moments, the player can make decisions that can lead to one of the three alternate endings (two of which are bad endings and the third is a good ending).

Plot 
Madison "Maddie" Raines works as manager, editor, and general business-handler of her best friend Tara Bryck's popular paranormal vlog channel called Taranormal, but she also intends to quit soon. She agrees to take one last trip with Tara to the mysterious village of Eysenfeld located within the snowy mountains to investigate the supernatural occurs there. They arrive there at night by train. A strange young woman named Morgan Fischer greets them, revealing that it was she who called them here. She takes them to a cabin for them to stay in for the month, but there is no phone signal or wi-fi. Along the way, they meet Evelyn, Morgan's abusive mother and the mayor of Eysenfeld, who warns them of the dangers that lie in the woods. The next morning, the duo visit town to investigate, but their presence gets the attention of the villagers. They interrogate an old man, two girls, and an old woman, but they prove to be no help as they do not believe in the paranormal forces in the forest unlike Morgan. The girls later visit Morgan's shop where they meet her talking cat named Geladura, who refuses to talk to them as she doesn't trust the newcomers. This leads Maddie to become skeptical of any supernatural forces in Eysenfeld, but Tara disagrees with her. Later at night, Morgan takes the girls to an old church that lies past the woods. Here, they learn that the church was once used by Morgan's ancestors before a giant creature that resembles a living tree passes by. 

Maddie and Tara begin to go their separate ways due to Maddie's desire to quit Taranormal and the footage that they captured somehow being corrupted. Tara and Morgan begin to fall in love and Morgan reveals the true reason why she called them: Evelyn is actually her adoptive mother and that she isn't human (it is implied that she killed Morgan's real parents and sabotaged Maddie and Tara's footage). She is an evil supernatural creature who is using a human body as a vessel and has been conducting rituals during full moons to transfer her soul into new bodies in order to stay alive; Morgan is the next host. She manipulated the townsfolks and Maddie earlier to try and get her and Tara to leave to stop them from finding out about her scheme. Meanwhile, Maddie comes across the ghost of a young woman, who is mute. This woman is Abigail, the victim of a centuries-old injustice now bound eternally to the forest for over 200 years. Back at the cabin, Maddie sees Tara outside and follows her, but she is revealed to be an illusion. Maddie eventually dies from the cold weather, but reawakens in the church alongside Abigail, who can now speak. It turns out she is now a ghost like Abigail and in a state between life and death. Abigail reveals that it was Evelyn who lured her into the woods with the Tara illusion in order to kill her, but she and her friend, the forest spirit, saved her. She takes Maddie to the forest grove, which has little snow and very tall trees, where they meet the forest spirit, who was the monster that the girls saw earlier. It turns out the forest spirit is actually very kind and beneficial and that its monstrous behavior was all Evelyn's doing. The girls also visit the fairy grove, which contains a pond and pink-colored trees and is the home of the snow fairies. Here, Abigail reveals that Eysenfeld is actually cursed and the townsfolk have been performing sacrifices at the church to keep a large monster (the forest spirit), believed to be responsible for the curse, from destroying the town, but they didn't know that the church's priest (who would eventually become Evelyn) is the one who is truly responsible for the curse and had manipulated the forest spirit and the townsfolk for her devious plot. Abigail's sister was going to be sacrificed next, but she took her place and her family allowed her to be sacrificed. However, the ritual failed and Abigail ended up dying in vain, but was saved by the forest spirit. She and Maddie begin to develop romantic feelings towards one another.  

Tara and Morgan attempt to break into a secret room to find out about Maddie's whereabouts, but Evelyn catches them and retaliates by attacking Tara. As Morgan nurses her back to health, Geladura reveals that she can truly talk, but still distrusts Tara. Morgan reveals that Geladura was once a fairy who was transformed into a cat by Evelyn and is constantly becoming more cat-like over the years. Meanwhile, Maddie and Abigail encounter some of the fairies, who are waiting for their queen to return and request for Maddie to be the new fairy queen, but she declines. They later visit Morgan and Tara, but cannot interact with them because they are ghosts and that Abigail can no longer make them visible. After encountering Evelyn, she is somehow able to see them, forcing them to flee. Sometime later, Evelyn brings Morgan to the forest grove where she forcefully makes her help destroy one of the ancestral trees before leaving Morgan to find her way home by herself. This harms the forest and causes Maddie to become transparent. After a young deer is gravely injured due to Evelyn's actions, the girls bring it to the fairy grove, where the forest spirit helps end its suffering. Aware that Maddie may disappear from existence because of the damage done to the forest, they go to ask the forest spirit for help, but it is unable to due to its weak condition caused by the damage. Abigail explains that the forest spirit's destiny is to become a new sacred tree, but it needs the fairy queen's help to do so; it hasn't been able to do this for years following the fairy queen's disappearance. Out of options, they head to the fairy grove and make a deal with the fairies to restore them to life in return for Maddie finding them a queen; either herself or someone else. They agree and give Maddie a flower crown, which turns her clothes into a beautiful dress. She uses her newfound powers to revive herself and Abigail. The fairies warn her that she must find someone to take over as the new queen and stop "the moonsick one" (Evelyn) before she can perform the ritual, otherwise Maddie will become the new queen permanently. They reveal that Evelyn was once a fairy who eventually went rogue, but also explain that moonlight is harmful to her and that she was using human bodies to protect herself from it. Maddie and Abigail return to the cabin where they reunite with Morgan and Tara. Maddie introduces Abigail to them and she and Tara make amends while Morgan reveals that Abigail is actually her distant ancestor. Geladura reveals her secret to Abigail and Maddie, as they have finally earned her trust. They then travel to the fairy grove, where the fairies recognize Geladura as the real fairy queen, who was forced to step down from her position after Evelyn turned her into a cat. After returning to the cabin, the girls spend the rest of the night talking to each other. 

That night, Tara is kidnapped by Evelyn, who decides to use her as the next host instead of Morgan, and takes her to the church to perform the ritual. Morgan and Geladura go to confront her, but she overwhelms them with painful illusions. Maddie uses her powers to teleport Evelyn to the fairy grove before the ritual can be finished as Morgan, Tara, and Geladura head there on foot. The girls then battle Evelyn. The outcome will depend on the player's earlier choices, which will lead to one of the three endings:

 Sacrifice Ending: Morgan sacrifices herself to kill Evelyn and break the curse and Geladura returns to her true form. Morgan's death devastates Tara and causes a rift between her and Maddie, who also blames herself. As they return home with Abigail, Abigail assures that Tara isn't angry with Maddie, who hopes that they will make amends in time as they return to Maddie's apartment.

 Freedom Ending: Geladura changes back into her true form and sacrifices herself to kill Evelyn, breaking the curse. Because Geladura is now gone, Maddie must stay in the forest forever and become the new fairy queen. She and Abigail then disappear, leaving Tara and Morgan devastated. After they return to the city, Tara quits Taranormal and informs Maddie's loved ones of her "death" while Morgan blames herself for what happened. She and Morgan eventually move out of Maddie's apartment and marry sometime in the future, thanking Maddie, Abigail, and Geladura for their happiness.
 
 True Ending: Maddie uses all of her powers to return Geladura to her true form (unlike other endings, she does not appear as a silhouette), causing Maddie's clothes to return to normal and her flower crown to disintegrate. Geladura then kills Evelyn, but also moans for who she once was. With the curse now finally broken, Geladura retakes her position as the fairy queen, freeing Maddie from this role and permanently returning her and Abigail to life. She creates a new fairy based on Maddie's likeness and helps the forest spirit become the new ancestral tree, finally forfilling its destiny. Abigail says goodbye to it as it becomes a normal tree. The girls visit the fairy grove one last time before returning to the city with Abigail and Morgan, planning to teach Abigail more about the modern world and have Morgan take over Maddie's duties on Taranormal. Later during the summer, they visit a beach.

Development 
Earlier in development, the setting was completely different, with it being a time travel story set in a small town. The developers said that they kept "running into plot holes or having trouble making certain parts interesting, so we decided to start from scratch." They maintained that one element kept from the earlier version was "love across time and boundaries". In terms of the soundtrack, the developers focused on using leitmotifs in order to represent certain elements of the game world like snow, and also used silence to heighten the dramatic tension of scenes.

Reception 
Digitally Downloaded gave the game a positive review, liking how the mystery and romance elements blended together, the reviewer did feel the game had a poor opening, writing that "Heart of the Woods does start slowly... This set-up is more than a little melodramatic, and it meanders its way to its conclusion." NoisyPixel liked the character art of the title, feeling the art helped to make the characters "expressive and fitting to the story", but felt the soundtrack could have been used better throughout the game. NoisyPixel also noted that the game had numerous slowdowns and crashes on the Switch version, leading to an unpleasant experience.

References 

2019 video games
Indie video games
Linux games
MacOS games
Nintendo Switch games
PlayStation 4 games
PlayStation 5 games
Ren'Py games
Video games about ghosts
Video games about time travel
Video games developed in the United States
Video games featuring female protagonists
Video games set in forests
Video games with alternate endings
Windows games
Xbox One games
Xbox Series X and Series S games
Yuri (genre) video games